Nithiazine is a nitromethylene neonicotinoid insecticide.  It is irritating to the eyes and skin, and is moderately toxic to mammals.

Nithiazine does not act as an acetylcholinesterase inhibitor.

References

Insecticides
Nitro compounds
Neonicotinoids